is a Japanese footballer currently playing as a midfielder for Cerezo Osaka.

Career statistics

Club
.

Notes

References

External links

2003 births
Living people
Association football people from Fukuoka Prefecture
Japanese footballers
Association football midfielders
J3 League players
Sagan Tosu players
Cerezo Osaka players
Cerezo Osaka U-23 players